Antonio Gibson may refer to:

Antonio Gibson (born 1998), American football running back
Antonio Gibson (safety) (born 1962), American football safety